Mercimek Ahmed (died after 1432) was an Ottoman author who flourished in the first third of the 15th century. He is principally known for translating the Persian Qabus-nama, written by the Ziyarid ruler Keikavus in 1082, into Old Ottoman. Mercimek's translation, which he completed in 1432, was simple, based on the spoken Turkish vernacular, and consisted of a mainly Turkish lexicon, but was written at a time when the Persianisation of Ottoman literature was underway. By the beginning of the 18th century, Mercimek's translation had come to be viewed as archaic and unsophisticated. As a result of 20th-century Turkish nationalist waves, which augmented the interest into the Turkic aspects of the Turkish language, his translation gained renewed appreciation.

Life
In his translation, Mercimek mentions his own name three times. However, he is not attested in the pre-modern biographical and historical Ottoman literary works. In his translation, only very little information can be found regarding his life. He flourished in the first third of the 15th century, and appears to have been a servant or courtier of Ottoman Sultan Murad II (1421–1444). He was well educated in the traditional religious and secular education by the standards of his own time. He is viewed as a person that was apparently moderate in his habits; in his own writings he states that he never indulged in the "calamitous" habit of wine-drinking in the morning. The work contains no information on how he obtained his unusual name, from Persian Marjumak, meaning "lentil". He died after 1432.

Qabus-nama translation and legacy
Keikavus' Qabus-nama, originally written in 1082 and belonging to the mirror for princes genre, held a prominent place in Ottoman akhlakh literature of the 14th and 15th centuries. During this time period, at least five separate prose version translations were produced of the Persian original, of which Mercimek's is the latest one and the one being best preserved. Mercimek completed his Old Ottoman translation on 26 April 1432, and wrote that that while he was in Sultan Murad's company at Philippopolis (modern-day Plovdiv, Bulgaria), he saw that Murad was reading the Qabus-nama in its Persian original. According to Mercimek's writings, when Murad complained that the existing Turkish translation was of low quality, he promptly started to write a new translation. In Mercimek's own words: "complete, without omitting a word; to the best of my ability explaining the more difficult words in it by extended comment so that the readers might enjoy its [full] meaning". It was copied after publication and circulated widely. Mercimek's translation has no independent title. Its manuscripts are labeled by headings such as Qabus-nama-yi Türkī or Terjeme-yi Qabus-nama.

The writing skill of Mercimek is deemed of much higher quality compared to his predecessors. Unlike his predecessors, Mercimek's writings attest to a writer who was neither imitatively literal, nor would give in to offhand omission. His translation is accompanied by numerous explanatory comments, as he vowed, or decided to paraphrase, when meticulousness might have concealed his purpose. Mercimek, on occasion, further animated his translation by spontaneously inserting suitable Turkish proverbs, or even verses of his own composition, in surplus to his trademark habit of rendering Kaykavus' illustrative verses of the Persian original into his own Turkish verse.

Mercimek's translation contrasts with other literary works of his time. At the time, literary Turkish, as the Ottomanist and Turkologist Eleazar Birnbaum calls it, was "at a crossroads". Some writers were creating a complex and pompous high insha style of literary Turkish, which was packed with Persian literary artifices, with a low amount of Turkish lexical material in favour of Arabic and Persian loanwords. Mercimek's translation differed, as the literary style he chose was quite simple and relied on the spoken Turkish vernacular, with its lexicon being majorly Turkish as well. Although during the following centuries some writers continued to choose simple Turkish for writing, the bulk of Ottoman literature would became increasingly ornate and Persianised. By the beginning of the 18th century, Mercimek's style and use of vocabulary had come to be viewed as obsolete and unsophisticated, with the renowned stylist and historian Nazmizade Murtaza of Baghdad being commissioned to revise Mercimek's Qabus-nama translation to make it fit in with contemporaneous literary taste.

As a result of 20th-century Turkish nationalist waves, which augmented the interest into the Turkic aspects of the Turkish language, his translation gained renewed appreciation.

Copies
Mercimek's translation can be found in a number of important manuscript collections, including:
 Ankara Milli Kütüphane nr. H. 941
 Topkapı Sarayı Müzesi Kütüphanesi, Hazine, nr. 1153
 Nuruosmaniye Kütüphane, nr. 4096
 BL, Turkish MSS, Or. 1181

References

Sources
 
 
 

Year of birth unknown
15th-century deaths
Turkish-language writers
Translators from Persian
15th-century writers from the Ottoman Empire